Mezzeh (also transcribed as al-Mazzah, el-Mezze, etc.) is a municipality in Damascus, Syria, due west of Kafr Sousa. It lies to the southwest of central Damascus, along the Mezzeh highway (also known as Fayez Mansour). 

It started gaining importance when the French constructed Mazzeh Military Airport, which was the main airport in Damascus until Damascus International Airport opened. It also held the notorious Mezzeh prison until 2000. The municipality includes the Damascus University and contains many foreign embassies. The current presidential palace sits atop Mount Mezzeh and overlooks all of Damascus.

It is one of the most modern and expensive areas of Damascus, especially the areas along the highway.

Districts
Al-Jalaa (pop. 3,514)
Western Villas (pop. 12,393)
Eastern Villas (pop. 13,776)
Mezzeh 86 (pop. 33,191)
Mezzeh al-Qadimeh (Old Mezzeh or Shaykh Sa'ad) (pop. 13,555)
Mezzeh Jabal (Mount Mezzeh) (pop. 22,655)
Al-Rabwa (pop. 10,002)
Al-Sumariyah (pop. 14,227)

The Western and Eastern Villa districts along the highway are affluent and cosmopolitan. The primarily Alawite Mezzeh 86 district is comparatively poor and has been described as a slum.

History
Mezzeh was originally a village outside of Damascus. It was allegedly founded between 661 and 750 by Yemeni migrants.

Mezzeh featured prominently in the 1941 Battle of Damascus. Compton Mackenzie later described it at the time as being "a large village standing at the junction of the road from Damascus to Beirut and Quneitra".

In 2012, during the Syrian civil war, residents participated in anti-government protests, resulting in arrests. In March 2012, the area experienced heavy fighting between government forces and defectors. The Alawite Mezzeh 86 neighborhood has been targeted by bombings of civilian and military targets.

Notable buildings and structures
 Presidential Palace, Damascus
 Former Mezzeh prison
 Mazzeh Military Airport
 Mezzeh Military Hospital. Officially titled as Hospital 601. Cited as the location of photographs submitted in the 2014 Syrian detainee report.

References

Neighborhoods of Damascus